The 1993 Washington Huskies football team was an American football team that represented the University of Washington during the 1993 NCAA Division I-A football season.  In its first season under head coach Jim Lambright, the team compiled a 7–4 record, finished in fourth place in the Pacific-10 Conference, and outscored its opponents by a combined total of 288 to 198. The team was not bowl-eligible, due to Pacific-10 conference sanctions.

With its two starting quarterbacks from 1992 selected in the NFL draft, the Huskies were led by sophomore Damon Huard and junior Eric Bjornson. Halfback Napoleon Kaufman was selected as the team's most valuable player.  Jamal Fountaine, Matt Jones, Andy Mason, and Jim Nevelle were the team captains.

Entering his nineteenth season as head coach of the Huskies, Don James retired on August 22, following the announcement of sanctions by the Pac-10 Conference, which included a two-year bowl ban. Defensive coordinator Lambright was quickly named the head coach.
   
Comedian and actor Joel McHale played as tight end on the scout team at Washington during the 1992 and 1993 seasons.

Schedule

Roster

Season summary

California

NFL Draft selections
One Washington player was selected in the 1994 NFL Draft:

 This draft was seven rounds, with 222 selections

Source:

Defensive tackle D'Marco Farr was undrafted, but played seven seasons with the Los Angeles/St. Louis Rams, which included a Super Bowl win and a Pro Bowl selection.

References

Washington
Washington Huskies football seasons
Washington Huskies football